The  was a field army of the Imperial Japanese Army formed during final stages of the Pacific War and based in Japanese-occupied Malaya, Singapore and Borneo, Java, and Sumatra.

History
The Japanese 7th Area Army was formed on March 19, 1944 under the Southern Expeditionary Army Group for the specific task of opposing landings by Allied forces in Japanese-occupied Malaya, Singapore and Borneo, Java, Sumatra and to consolidate a new defense line after the loss of the Solomon Islands, New Guinea and eastern portions of the Netherlands East Indies. It had its headquarters at Singapore.

The units initially assigned to the Area Army were the 16th, 25th and 29th Army's. Units stationed in Borneo were also transferred to the Area Army's control.

The Army was demobilized at Singapore on the surrender of Japan at the end of World War II.

List of Commanders

Commanding officer

Chief of Staff

References

Books

External links

Notes 

7
Military units and formations established in 1944
Military units and formations disestablished in 1945
Japanese occupation of Singapore